María Teresita de Jesús Reyes Aleuanlli (born 4 February 1950 in Osorno), known as Teresita Reyes, is a Chilean actress. She is of Palestinian ancestry on her mother's side.

Filmography

Movies 
 Sussi (film) (1987) 
 Te amo (2001) 
 Promedio rojo (2004) – Madre de Roberto
 El brindis (2007) – Sandra 
 Normal con Alas (2007) – Jovita Maulén
 Santos (2008) – Madre de Busiek

Television

References

External links 
 

1950 births
People from Puerto Montt
Living people
Chilean television actresses
Chilean film actresses
Chilean stage actresses
Chilean people of Palestinian descent